The 1979 GP Ouest-France was the 43rd edition of the GP Ouest-France cycle race and was held on 21 August 1979. The race started and finished in Plouay. The race was won by Frits Pirard of the Miko–Mercier team.

General classification

References

1979
1979 in road cycling
1979 in French sport
August 1979 sports events in Europe